Marc Iselin (born 29 April 1980 in Schlieren) is a Swiss snowboarder. He placed 19th in the men's parallel giant slalom event at the 2010 Winter Olympics.

References

1980 births
Living people
Swiss male snowboarders
Olympic snowboarders of Switzerland
Snowboarders at the 2010 Winter Olympics